On/Off is an EP by Run On, released on June 6, 1995 through Matador Records.

Track listing

Personnel 
Run On
Rick Brown – drums, synthesizer, piano, vocals
Sue Garner – guitar, bass guitar, vocals
Alan Licht – guitar, bass guitar, harmonica, marimba
David Newgarden – organ
Production and additional personnel
Greg Calbi – mastering
Juan Garcia – engineering
Gene Holder – production, recording
Matthew J. Minehan – engineering
Run On – production
Jon Sowle – engineering

References

External links 
 

1995 EPs
Matador Records EPs
Run On (band) albums